Bački Vinogradi (or ) is a village in Serbia. It is situated in the Subotica municipality, in the North Bačka District, Vojvodina province. The village has a Hungarian ethnic majority and its population numbering 2,039 people (2002 census).

See also
List of places in Serbia
List of cities, towns and villages in Vojvodina

External links
 History of Bački Vinogradi 

Places in Bačka
Subotica
Hungarian communities in Serbia